Lino Červar (born 22 September 1950) is a Croatian retired handball coach. In 2003 he guided Croatia men's national handball team to gold in the 2003 World Championship as well as to gold at the 2004 Olympics. 

As a member of the largest centre-right political party in Croatia–the Croatian Democratic Union (HDZ)–he was a member of the Croatian Parliament from 2003 to 2008.

Apart from Croatian, Červar also holds Macedonian citizenship.

Coaching career

Červar started his club head coaching career in 1974 with RK Triko Novigrad. He was the head coach of RK Istraturist Umag from 1980 until 1991 when he was appointed as the head coach of Austrian team Klagenfurt.

In 2000 Červar was hired by Croatian powerhouse Badel 1862 Zagreb to be their head coach. He resigned from Zagreb in 2001. Between 2002 and 2004 he coached Italian team Papilon Conversano and then returned to RK Zagreb (then named Croatia Osiguranje Zagreb).

In 2009 Červar was hired by Macedonian team RK Metalurg Skopje but he left the club in April 2017 due to return in the Croatian national team as the head coach.

In June 2018 he was named the head coach of RK Zagreb for the third time in his coaching career but in November 2018 he announced his resignation from the club due to his obligations with Croatia's team.

National team coaching career

After serving as the head coach of the Italy men's team, Červar started his tenure coaching the Croatia men's team in 2002. He led the team to victory in the 2003 World Championship, to gold in the 2004 Summer Olympics and to silver in the 2005 World Championship. Croatia also received then silver medal at the 2008 European Championship after playing the final game against Denmark as well as at the 2009 World Championship and 2010 European Championship after playing both championships' final games against France. He parted ways with the Croatian Handball Federation in 2010.

In 2016 Červar took over the Macedonia men's team as the head coach where he stayed for the 2017 World Championship but left the bench following the poor performance at the tournament which took place in January in France.

In March 2017 Červar returned to the Croatian national team as the head coach, following the departure of Željko Babić in January the same year. In his second mandate at Croatia bench he guided the team to the fifth place at the 2018 European Championship while at the 2019 World Championship Croatia managed to win the sixth place. In July 2018 Croatia celebrated winning the Mediterranean Games tournament in Tarragona. On 26 January 2020 Červar celebrated winning his third European silver medal with Croatia, this time at the Championship in Sweden, Austria & Norway following the final game defeat from Spain. In January 2021, following a surprising debacle at the World Championship in Egypt, Červar resigned as head coach and was succeeded by his assistant Hrvoje Horvat.

Personal life
Born in the village of Delići near Vrsar in Istria region of Croatia, Červar married his wife Klaudija in 1975. The couple have two daughters. He was a member of the Croatian Parliament from December 2003 to January 2008 as a member of the conservative Croatian Democratic Union (HDZ) party.

Honours

Coach

Club 
RK Triko Novigrad
Croatian Regional League – West: 1977–78

RK Istraturist Umag
Yugoslav Third League: 1980–81, 1983–84
Yugoslav Second League: 1989–90

RK Zagreb
Croatian First League: 2000–01, 2001–02, 2004–05, 2005–06, 2006–07, 2007–08, 2008–09
Croatian Cup: 2005, 2006, 2007, 2008, 2009
EHF Cup Winners' Cup runner-up: 2005

Papilon Conversano
Serie A: 2002–03, 2003–04
Italian Cup: 2003

RK Metalurg Skopje
Macedonian Super League: 2009–10, 2010–11, 2011–12, 2013–14
Macedonian Cup: 2010, 2011, 2013
SEHA League runner-up: 2011–12

International
Italy
1997 Mediterranean Games: 2nd place

Croatia
2003 World Championship: 1st place
2003 Sportske novosti awards: Team of the year
2004 Summer Olympics: 1st place
2004 Franjo Bučar State Award for Sport
2004 Sportske novosti awards: Team of the year
2005 Croatia Cup: 1st place
2005 World Championship: 2nd place
2005 Mediterranean Games: 2nd place
2006 Croatia Cup: 1st place
2006 BiH Trophy: 3rd place
2006 World Cup in Sweden & Germany: 1st place
2007 Croatia Cup: 1st place
2008 Croatia Cup: 1st place
2008 European Championship: 2nd place
2008 Interwetten Cup: 2nd place
2009 World Championship: 2nd place 
2018 Mediterranean Games: 1st place
2020 European Championship: 2nd place
2009 Sportske novosti awards: Team of the Year
2010 Interwetten Cup: 1st place
2010 European Championship: 2nd place
2020 European Championship: 2nd place

Individual
Franjo Bučar State Award for Sport: 2003
Croatian Coach of the Year: 2004
Honoured for coaching career by Faculty of Kinesiology in Zagreb: 2009
Matija Ljubek lifetime achievement award by the Croatian Olympic Committee: 2010
Best handball Coach of the Year in North Macedonia: 2011
EHF Coaching Achievement Award: 2016

References

1950 births
Living people
Croatian handball coaches
Representatives in the modern Croatian Parliament
People from Istria
Croatian Democratic Union politicians
Croatian male handball players
RK Zagreb coaches
Croatian expatriate sportspeople in Austria
Croatian expatriate sportspeople in Italy
Croatian expatriate sportspeople in North Macedonia
Handball coaches of international teams
Macedonian people of Croatian descent